Ammonia is an inorganic compound of nitrogen and hydrogen with the formula . A stable binary hydride, and the simplest pnictogen hydride, ammonia is a colourless gas with a distinct pungent smell. Biologically, it is a common nitrogenous waste, particularly among aquatic organisms, and it contributes significantly to the nutritional needs of terrestrial organisms by serving as a precursor to 45% of the world's food and fertilizers. Around 70% of ammonia is used to make fertilisers in various forms and composition, such as urea and Diammonium phosphate. Ammonia in pure form is also applied directly into the soil.

Ammonia, either directly or indirectly, is also a building block for the synthesis of many pharmaceutical products and is used in many commercial cleaning products. It is mainly collected by downward displacement of both air and water.

Although common in nature—both terrestrially and in the outer planets of the Solar System—and in wide use, ammonia is both caustic and hazardous in its concentrated form. In many countries it is classified as an extremely hazardous substance, and is subject to strict reporting requirements by facilities which produce, store, or use it in significant quantities.

The global industrial production of ammonia in 2018 was 175 million tonnes, with no significant change relative to the 2013 global industrial production of 175 million tonnes. In 2021 this was 235 million tonnes, with very little being made within the United States. Industrial ammonia is sold either as ammonia liquor (usually 28% ammonia in water) or as pressurized or refrigerated anhydrous liquid ammonia transported in tank cars or cylinders.

For fundamental reasons, the production of ammonia from the elements hydrogen and nitrogen is difficult, requiring high pressures and high temperatures. The Haber process that enabled industrial production was invented at the beginning of the 20th century, revolutionizing agriculture. 

The concentration of such solutions is measured in units of the Baumé scale (density), with 26 degrees Baumé (about 30% of ammonia by weight at ) being the typical high-concentration commercial product.

Etymology
Pliny, in Book XXXI of his Natural History, refers to a salt named hammoniacum, so called because of its proximity to the nearby Temple of Jupiter Amun (Greek Ἄμμων Ammon) in the Roman province of Cyrenaica. However, the description Pliny gives of the salt does not conform to the properties of ammonium chloride. According to Herbert Hoover's commentary in his English translation of Georgius Agricola's De re metallica, it is likely to have been common sea salt. In any case, that salt ultimately gave ammonia and ammonium compounds their name. Roman visitors to oracle temple of Amun in Siwa oasis collected a white crystalline material from the ceiling and walls caused by various pollutants. This white crystalline salt was called "salt of Ammon" (sal ammoniac). Joseph Priestley noticed that when this salt reacted with lime, a vapor was released, which he termed as Ammonia.

Natural occurrence
Ammonia is a chemical found in trace quantities on Earth, being produced from nitrogenous animal and vegetable matter. Ammonia and ammonium salts are also found in small quantities in rainwater, whereas ammonium chloride (sal ammoniac), and ammonium sulfate are found in volcanic districts. Crystals of ammonium bicarbonate have been found in Patagonia guano.

Ammonia is also found throughout the Solar System on Mars, Jupiter, Saturn, Uranus, Neptune, and Pluto, among other places: on smaller, icy bodies such as Pluto, ammonia can act as a geologically important antifreeze, as a mixture of water and ammonia can have a melting point as low as  if the ammonia concentration is high enough and thus allow such bodies to retain internal oceans and active geology at a far lower temperature than would be possible with water alone. Substances containing ammonia, or those that are similar to it, are called ammoniacal.

Properties

Ammonia is a colourless gas with a characteristically pungent smell. It is lighter than air, its density being 0.589 times that of air. It is easily liquefied due to the strong hydrogen bonding between molecules. Few data are available at very high temperatures and pressures, such as supercritical conditions.

Solid
The crystal symmetry is cubic, Pearson symbol cP16, space group P213 No.198, lattice constant 0.5125 nm.

Liquid
Liquid ammonia possesses strong ionising powers reflecting its high ε of 22. Liquid ammonia has a very high standard enthalpy change of vaporization (23.35 kJ/mol, for comparison water 40.65 kJ/mol, methane 8.19 kJ/mol, phosphine 14.6 kJ/mol) and can therefore be used in laboratories in uninsulated vessels without additional refrigeration. See liquid ammonia as a solvent.

Solvent properties
Ammonia readily dissolves in water. In an aqueous solution, it can be expelled by boiling. The aqueous solution of ammonia is basic. The maximum concentration of ammonia in water (a saturated solution) has a density of 0.880 g/cm3 and is often known as '.880 ammonia'.

Decomposition
At high temperature and in the presence of a suitable catalyst or in a pressurized vessel with constant volume and high temperature (e.g. ), ammonia is decomposed into its constituent elements. Decomposition of ammonia is a slightly endothermic process requiring 23 kJ/mol (5.5 kcal/mol) of ammonia, and yields hydrogen and nitrogen gas. Ammonia can also be used as a source of hydrogen for acid fuel cells if the unreacted ammonia can be removed. Ruthenium and platinum catalysts were found to be the most active, whereas supported Ni catalysts were less active.

Table of thermal and physical properties of saturated liquid ammonia:

Table of thermal and physical properties of ammonia at atmospheric pressure:

Structure
The ammonia molecule has a trigonal pyramidal shape as predicted by the valence shell electron pair repulsion theory (VSEPR theory) with an experimentally determined bond angle of 106.7°. The central nitrogen atom has five outer electrons with an additional electron from each hydrogen atom. This gives a total of eight electrons, or four electron pairs that are arranged tetrahedrally. Three of these electron pairs are used as bond pairs, which leaves one lone pair of electrons. The lone pair repels more strongly than bond pairs, therefore the bond angle is not 109.5°, as expected for a regular tetrahedral arrangement, but 106.8°. This shape gives the molecule a dipole moment and makes it polar. The molecule's polarity, and especially, its ability to form hydrogen bonds, makes ammonia highly miscible with water. The lone pair makes ammonia a base, a proton acceptor. Ammonia is moderately basic; a 1.0 M aqueous solution has a pH of 11.6, and if a strong acid is added to such a solution until the solution is neutral (pH = 7), 99.4% of the ammonia molecules are protonated. Temperature and salinity also affect the proportion of ammonium . The latter has the shape of a regular tetrahedron and is isoelectronic with methane.

The ammonia molecule readily undergoes nitrogen inversion at room temperature; a useful analogy is an umbrella turning itself inside out in a strong wind. The energy barrier to this inversion is 24.7 kJ/mol, and the resonance frequency is 23.79 GHz, corresponding to microwave radiation of a wavelength of 1.260 cm. The absorption at this frequency was the first microwave spectrum to be observed  and was used in the first maser.

Amphotericity
One of the most characteristic properties of ammonia is its basicity. Ammonia is considered to be a weak base. It combines with acids to form ammonium salts; thus with hydrochloric acid it forms ammonium chloride (sal ammoniac); with nitric acid, ammonium nitrate, etc. Perfectly dry ammonia gas will not combine with perfectly dry hydrogen chloride gas; moisture is necessary to bring about the reaction.

As a demonstration experiment under air with ambient moisture, opened bottles of concentrated ammonia and hydrochloric acid solutions produce a cloud of ammonium chloride, which seems to appear "out of nothing" as the salt aerosol forms where the two diffusing clouds of reagents meet between the two bottles.

The salts produced by the action of ammonia on acids are known as the ammonium salts and all contain the ammonium ion.

Although ammonia is well known as a weak base, it can also act as an extremely weak acid. It is a protic substance and is capable of formation of amides (which contain the  ion). For example, lithium dissolves in liquid ammonia to give a blue solution (solvated electron) of lithium amide:

Self-dissociation
Like water, liquid ammonia undergoes molecular autoionisation to form its acid and base conjugates:

Ammonia often functions as a weak base, so it has some buffering ability. Shifts in pH will cause more or fewer ammonium cations and amide anions to be present in solution. At standard pressure and temperature,
K =  = 10−30.

Combustion
Ammonia does not burn readily or sustain combustion, except under narrow fuel-to-air mixtures of 15–25% air. When mixed with oxygen, it burns with a pale yellowish-green flame. Ignition occurs when chlorine is passed into ammonia, forming nitrogen and hydrogen chloride; if chlorine is present in excess, then the highly explosive nitrogen trichloride is also formed.

The combustion of ammonia to form nitrogen and water is exothermic:

, ΔH°r = −1267.20 kJ (or −316.8 kJ/mol if expressed per mol of )

The standard enthalpy change of combustion, ΔH°c, expressed per mole of ammonia and with condensation of the water formed, is −382.81 kJ/mol. Nitrogen oxides can be formed as kinetic products in the presence of appropriate catalysts, a reaction of great industrial importance in the production of nitric acid:

A subsequent reaction leads to :

The combustion of ammonia in air is very difficult in the absence of a catalyst (such as platinum gauze or warm chromium(III) oxide), due to the relatively low heat of combustion, a lower laminar burning velocity, high auto-ignition temperature, high heat of vaporization, and a narrow flammability range. However, recent studies have shown that efficient and stable combustion of ammonia can be achieved using swirl combustors, thereby rekindling research interest in ammonia as a fuel for thermal power production. The flammable range of ammonia in dry air is 15.15–27.35% and in 100% relative humidity air is 15.95–26.55%. For studying the kinetics of ammonia combustion, knowledge of a detailed reliable reaction mechanism is required, but this has been challenging to obtain.

Formation of other compounds
Ammonia is a direct or indirect precursor to most manufactured nitrogen-containing compounds.

In organic chemistry, ammonia can act as a nucleophile in substitution reactions. Amines can be formed by the reaction of ammonia with alkyl halides or with alcohols. The resulting − group is also nucleophilic so secondary and tertiary amines are often formed. When such multiple substitution is not desired, an excess of ammonia helps minimise it. For example, methylamine is prepared by the reaction of ammonia with chloromethane or with methanol. In both cases, dimethylamine and trimethylamine are co-produced. Ethanolamine is prepared by a ring-opening reaction with ethylene oxide, and when the reaction is allowed to go further it produces diethanolamine and triethanolamine. The reaction of ammonia with 2-bromopropanoic acid has been used to prepare racemic alanine in 70% yield.

Amides can be prepared by the reaction of ammonia with carboxylic acid derivatives. For example, ammonia reacts with formic acid (HCOOH) to yield formamide when heated. Acyl chlorides are the most reactive, but the ammonia must be present in at least a twofold excess to neutralise the hydrogen chloride formed. Esters and anhydrides also react with ammonia to form amides. Ammonium salts of carboxylic acids can be dehydrated to amides by heating to 150–200 °C as long as no thermally sensitive groups are present.

The hydrogen in ammonia is susceptible to replacement by a myriad of substituents. When dry ammonia gas is heated with metallic sodium it converts to sodamide, . With chlorine, monochloramine is formed.

Pentavalent ammonia is known as λ5-amine or, more commonly, ammonium hydride . This crystalline solid is only stable under high pressure and decomposes back into trivalent ammonia (λ3-amine) and hydrogen gas at normal conditions. This substance was once investigated as a possible solid rocket fuel in 1966.

Ammonia as a ligand 

Ammonia can act as a ligand in transition metal complexes. It is a pure σ-donor, in the middle of the spectrochemical series, and shows intermediate hard–soft behaviour (see also ECW model). Its relative donor strength toward a series of acids, versus other Lewis bases, can be illustrated by C-B plots. For historical reasons, ammonia is named ammine in the nomenclature of coordination compounds. Some notable ammine complexes include tetraamminediaquacopper(II), a dark blue complex formed by adding ammonia to a solution of copper(II) salts. Tetraamminediaquacopper(II) hydroxide is known as Schweizer's reagent, and has the remarkable ability to dissolve cellulose. Diamminesilver(I) is the active species in Tollens' reagent. Formation of this complex can also help to distinguish between precipitates of the different silver halides: silver chloride (AgCl) is soluble in dilute (2 M) ammonia solution, silver bromide (AgBr) is only soluble in concentrated ammonia solution, whereas silver iodide (AgI) is insoluble in aqueous ammonia.

Ammine complexes of chromium(III) were known in the late 19th century, and formed the basis of Alfred Werner's revolutionary theory on the structure of coordination compounds. Werner noted only two isomers (fac- and mer-) of the complex  could be formed, and concluded the ligands must be arranged around the metal ion at the vertices of an octahedron. This proposal has since been confirmed by X-ray crystallography.

An ammine ligand bound to a metal ion is markedly more acidic than a free ammonia molecule, although deprotonation in aqueous solution is still rare. One example is the reaction of mercury(II) chloride with ammonia (Calomel reaction) where the resulting mercuric amidochloride is highly insoluble.

Ammonia is a hard base (HSAB theory) and its E & C parameters are EB = 2.31 and CB = 2.04. Its relative donor strength toward a series of acids, versus other Lewis bases, can be illustrated by C-B plots.

Detection and determination

Ammonia in solution

Ammonia and ammonium salts can be readily detected, in very minute traces, by the addition of Nessler's solution, which gives a distinct yellow colouration in the presence of the slightest trace of ammonia or ammonium salts. The amount of ammonia in ammonium salts can be estimated quantitatively by distillation of the salts with sodium (NaOH) or potassium hydroxide (KOH), the ammonia evolved being absorbed in a known volume of standard sulfuric acid and the excess of acid then determined volumetrically; or the ammonia may be absorbed in hydrochloric acid and the ammonium chloride so formed precipitated as ammonium hexachloroplatinate, .

Gaseous ammonia
Sulfur sticks are burnt to detect small leaks in industrial ammonia refrigeration systems. Larger quantities can be detected by warming the salts with a caustic alkali or with quicklime, when the characteristic smell of ammonia will be at once apparent. Ammonia is an irritant and irritation increases with concentration; the permissible exposure limit is 25 ppm, and lethal above 500 ppm. Higher concentrations are hardly detected by conventional detectors, the type of detector is chosen according to the sensitivity required (e.g. semiconductor, catalytic, electrochemical). Holographic sensors have been proposed for detecting concentrations up to 12.5% in volume.

Ammoniacal nitrogen (NH3-N)
Ammoniacal nitrogen (NH3-N) is a measure commonly used for testing the quantity of ammonium ions, derived naturally from ammonia, and returned to ammonia via organic processes, in water or waste liquids. It is a measure used mainly for quantifying values in waste treatment and water purification systems, as well as a measure of the health of natural and man-made water reserves. It is measured in units of mg/L (milligram per litre).

History

The ancient Greek historian Herodotus mentioned that there were outcrops of salt in an area of Libya that was inhabited by a people called the "Ammonians" (now: the Siwa oasis in northwestern Egypt, where salt lakes still exist). The Greek geographer Strabo also mentioned the salt from this region. However, the ancient authors Dioscorides, Apicius, Arrian, Synesius, and Aëtius of Amida described this salt as forming clear crystals that could be used for cooking and that were essentially rock salt. Hammoniacus sal appears in the writings of Pliny, although it is not known whether the term is identical with the more modern sal ammoniac (ammonium chloride).

The fermentation of urine by bacteria produces a solution of ammonia; hence fermented urine was used in Classical Antiquity to wash cloth and clothing, to remove hair from hides in preparation for tanning, to serve as a mordant in dying cloth, and to remove rust from iron. It was also used by ancient dentists to wash teeth.

In the form of sal ammoniac (نشادر, nushadir), ammonia was important to the Muslim alchemists. It was mentioned in the Book of Stones, likely written in the 9th century and attributed to Jābir ibn Hayyān. It was also important to the European alchemists of the 13th century, being mentioned by Albertus Magnus. It was also used by dyers in the Middle Ages in the form of fermented urine to alter the colour of vegetable dyes. In the 15th century, Basilius Valentinus showed that ammonia could be obtained by the action of alkalis on sal ammoniac. At a later period, when sal ammoniac was obtained by distilling the hooves and horns of oxen and neutralizing the resulting carbonate with hydrochloric acid, the name "spirit of hartshorn" was applied to ammonia.

Gaseous ammonia was first isolated by Joseph Black in 1756 by reacting sal ammoniac (ammonium chloride) with calcined magnesia (magnesium oxide). It was isolated again by Peter Woulfe in 1767, by Carl Wilhelm Scheele in 1770 and by Joseph Priestley in 1773 and was termed by him "alkaline air". Eleven years later in 1785, Claude Louis Berthollet ascertained its composition.

The Haber–Bosch process to produce ammonia from the nitrogen in the air was developed by Fritz Haber and Carl Bosch in 1909 and patented in 1910. It was first used on an industrial scale in Germany during World War I, following the allied blockade that cut off the supply of nitrates from Chile. The ammonia was used to produce explosives to sustain war efforts.

Before the availability of natural gas, hydrogen as a precursor to ammonia production was produced via the electrolysis of water or using the chloralkali process.

With the advent of the steel industry in the 20th century, ammonia became a byproduct of the production of coking coal.

Applications

Solvent 

Liquid ammonia is the best-known and most widely studied nonaqueous ionising solvent. Its most conspicuous property is its ability to dissolve alkali metals to form highly coloured, electrically conductive solutions containing solvated electrons. Apart from these remarkable solutions, much of the chemistry in liquid ammonia can be classified by analogy with related reactions in aqueous solutions. The ionic self-dissociation constant of liquid  at −50 °C is about 10−33.

Solubility of salts 

Liquid ammonia is an ionising solvent, although less so than water, and dissolves a range of ionic compounds, including many nitrates, nitrites, cyanides, thiocyanates, metal cyclopentadienyl complexes and metal bis(trimethylsilyl)amides. Most ammonium salts are soluble and act as acids in liquid ammonia solutions. The solubility of halide salts increases from fluoride to iodide.

Solutions of metals 

Liquid ammonia will dissolve all of the alkali metals and other electropositive metals such as Ca, Sr, Ba, Eu, and Yb (also Mg using an electrolytic process). At low concentrations (<0.06 mol/L), deep blue solutions are formed: these contain metal cations and solvated electrons, free electrons that are surrounded by a cage of ammonia molecules.

These solutions are very useful as strong reducing agents. At higher concentrations, the solutions are metallic in appearance and in electrical conductivity. At low temperatures, the two types of solution can coexist as immiscible phases.

Redox properties of liquid ammonia 

The range of thermodynamic stability of liquid ammonia solutions is very narrow, as the potential for oxidation to dinitrogen, E°, is only +0.04 V. In practice, both oxidation to dinitrogen and reduction to dihydrogen are slow. This is particularly true of reducing solutions: the solutions of the alkali metals mentioned above are stable for several days, slowly decomposing to the metal amide and dihydrogen. Most studies involving liquid ammonia solutions are done in reducing conditions; although oxidation of liquid ammonia is usually slow, there is still a risk of explosion, particularly if transition metal ions are present as possible catalysts.

Fertilizer
In the US as of 2019, approximately 88% of ammonia was used as fertilizers either as its salts, solutions or anhydrously. When applied to soil, it helps provide increased yields of crops such as maize and wheat. 30% of agricultural nitrogen applied in the US is in the form of anhydrous ammonia and worldwide 110 million tonnes are applied each year.

Precursor to nitrogenous compounds
Ammonia is directly or indirectly the precursor to most nitrogen-containing compounds. Virtually all synthetic nitrogen compounds are derived from ammonia. An important derivative is nitric acid. Nitric oxide is an intermediate in this conversion:

Nitric acid is used for the production of fertilizers, explosives, and many organonitrogen compounds.

Ammonia is also used to make the following compounds:
Hydrazine, in the Olin Raschig process and the peroxide process
Hydrogen cyanide, in the BMA process and the Andrussow process
Hydroxylamine and ammonium carbonate, in the Raschig process
Phenol, in the Raschig–Hooker process
Urea, in the Bosch–Meiser urea process and in Wöhler synthesis
Amino acids, using Strecker amino-acid synthesis
Acrylonitrile, in the Sohio process

Ammonia can also be used to make compounds in reactions which are not specifically named. Examples of such compounds include: ammonium perchlorate, ammonium nitrate, formamide, dinitrogen tetroxide, alprazolam, ethanolamine, ethyl carbamate, hexamethylenetetramine, and ammonium bicarbonate.

Cleansing agent

Because ammonia results in a relatively streak-free shine, one of its most common uses is to clean glass, porcelain, and stainless steel. It is also frequently used for cleaning ovens and for soaking items to loosen baked-on grime. Household ammonia ranges in concentration by weight from 5% to 10% ammonia. US manufacturers of cleaning products are required to provide the product's material safety data sheet which lists the concentration used.

Solutions of ammonia (5–10% by weight) are used as household cleaners, particularly for glass. These solutions are irritating to the eyes and mucous membranes (respiratory and digestive tracts), and to a lesser extent the skin. Experts advise that caution be used to ensure the chemical is not mixed into any liquid containing bleach, due to the danger of forming toxic chlorine gas. Mixing with chlorine-containing products or strong oxidants, such as household bleach, can generate toxic chloramine fumes.

Experts also warn not to use ammonia-based cleaners (such as glass or window cleaners) on car touchscreens, due to the risk of damage to the screen's anti-glare and anti-fingerprint coatings.

Fermentation
Solutions of ammonia ranging from 16% to 25% are used in the fermentation industry as a source of nitrogen for microorganisms and to adjust pH during fermentation.

Antimicrobial agent for food products
As early as in 1895, it was known that ammonia was "strongly antiseptic ... it requires 1.4 grams per litre to preserve beef tea (broth)." In one study, anhydrous ammonia destroyed 99.999% of zoonotic bacteria in 3 types of animal feed, but not silage. Anhydrous ammonia is currently used commercially to reduce or eliminate microbial contamination of beef.
Lean finely textured beef (popularly known as "pink slime") in the beef industry is made from fatty beef trimmings (c. 50–70% fat) by removing the fat using heat and centrifugation, then treating it with ammonia to kill E. coli. The process was deemed effective and safe by the US Department of Agriculture based on a study that found that the treatment reduces E. coli to undetectable levels. There have been safety concerns about the process as well as consumer complaints about the taste and smell of ammonia-treated beef.

Fuel 

The raw energy density of liquid ammonia is 11.5 MJ/L, which is about a third that of diesel. There is the opportunity to convert ammonia back to hydrogen, where it can be used to power hydrogen fuel cells, or it may be used directly within high-temperature solid oxide direct ammonia fuel cells to provide efficient power sources that do not emit greenhouse gases.

The conversion of ammonia to hydrogen via the sodium amide process, either for combustion or as fuel for a proton exchange membrane fuel cell, is possible. Another method is the catalytic decomposition of ammonia using solid catalysts. Conversion to hydrogen would allow the storage of hydrogen at nearly 18 wt% compared to ≈5% for gaseous hydrogen under pressure.

Ammonia engines or ammonia motors, using ammonia as a working fluid, have been proposed and occasionally used. The principle is similar to that used in a fireless locomotive, but with ammonia as the working fluid, instead of steam or compressed air. Ammonia engines were used experimentally in the 19th century by Goldsworthy Gurney in the UK and the St. Charles Avenue Streetcar line in New Orleans in the 1870s and 1880s, and during World War II ammonia was used to power buses in Belgium.

Ammonia is sometimes proposed as a practical alternative to fossil fuel for internal combustion engines.

Its high octane rating of 120 and low flame temperature allows the use of high compression ratios without a penalty of high  production. Since ammonia contains no carbon, its combustion cannot produce carbon dioxide, carbon monoxide, hydrocarbons, or soot.

Ammonia production currently creates 1.8% of global  emissions. "Green ammonia" is ammonia produced by using green hydrogen (hydrogen produced by electrolysis), whereas "blue ammonia" is ammonia produced using blue hydrogen (hydrogen produced by steam methane reforming where the carbon dioxide has been captured and stored).

However, ammonia cannot be easily used in existing Otto cycle engines because of its very narrow flammability range. The 60 MW Rjukan dam in Telemark, Norway, produced ammonia for many years from 1913, providing fertilizer for much of Europe. Despite this, several tests have been run.

Compared to hydrogen as a fuel, ammonia is much more energy efficient, and could be produced, stored, and delivered at a much lower cost than hydrogen, which must be kept compressed or as a cryogenic liquid.

Rocket engines have also been fueled by ammonia. The Reaction Motors XLR99 rocket engine that powered the  hypersonic research aircraft used liquid ammonia. Although not as powerful as other fuels, it left no soot in the reusable rocket engine, and its density approximately matches the density of the oxidizer, liquid oxygen, which simplified the aircraft's design.

In early August 2018, scientists from Australia's Commonwealth Scientific and Industrial Research Organisation (CSIRO) announced the success of developing a process to release hydrogen from ammonia and harvest that at ultra-high purity as a fuel for cars. This uses a special membrane. Two demonstration fuel cell vehicles have the technology, a Hyundai Nexo and Toyota Mirai.

In 2020, Saudi Arabia shipped 40 metric tons of liquid "blue ammonia" to Japan for use as a fuel. It was produced as a by-product by petrochemical industries, and can be burned without giving off greenhouse gases. Its energy density by volume is nearly double that of liquid hydrogen. If the process of creating it can be scaled up via purely renewable resources, producing green ammonia, it could make a major difference in avoiding climate change. The company ACWA Power and the city of Neom have announced the construction of a green hydrogen and ammonia plant in 2020.

Green ammonia is considered as a potential fuel for future container ships. In 2020, the companies DSME and MAN Energy Solutions announced the construction of an ammonia-based ship, DSME plans to commercialize it by 2025. The use of ammonia as a potential alternative fuel for aircraft jet engines is also being explored.

Japan intends to implement a plan to develop ammonia co-firing technology that can increase the use of ammonia in power generation, as part of efforts to assist domestic and other Asian utilities to accelerate their transition to carbon neutrality. 
In October 2021, the first International Conference on Fuel Ammonia (ICFA2021) was held.

In June 2022, IHI Corporation succeeded in reducing greenhouse gases by over 99% during combustion of liquid ammonia in a 2,000-kilowatt-class gas turbine achieving truly -free power generation.
In July 2022, Quad nations of Japan, the U.S., Australia and India agreed to promote technological development for clean-burning hydrogen and ammonia as fuels at the security grouping's first energy meeting. Nitrous oxide may also be a problem.

Other

Remediation of gaseous emissions
Ammonia is used to scrub  from the burning of fossil fuels, and the resulting product is converted to ammonium sulfate for use as fertilizer. Ammonia neutralises the nitrogen oxide pollutants emitted by diesel engines. This technology, called SCR (selective catalytic reduction), relies on a vanadia-based catalyst.

Ammonia may be used to mitigate gaseous spills of phosgene.

As a hydrogen carrier
Due to its attributes, being liquid at ambient temperature under its own vapour pressure and having high volumetric and gravimetric energy density, ammonia is considered a suitable carrier for hydrogen, and may be cheaper than direct transport of liquid hydrogen.

Refrigeration – R717
Because of ammonia's vaporization properties, it is a useful refrigerant. It was commonly used before the popularisation of chlorofluorocarbons (Freons). Anhydrous ammonia is widely used in industrial refrigeration applications and hockey rinks because of its high energy efficiency and low cost. It suffers from the disadvantage of toxicity, and requiring corrosion resistant components, which restricts its domestic and small-scale use. Along with its use in modern vapor-compression refrigeration it is used in a mixture along with hydrogen and water in absorption refrigerators. The Kalina cycle, which is of growing importance to geothermal power plants, depends on the wide boiling range of the ammonia–water mixture. Ammonia coolant is also used in the S1 radiator aboard the International Space Station in two loops which are used to regulate the internal temperature and enable temperature-dependent experiments.

The potential importance of ammonia as a refrigerant has increased with the discovery that vented CFCs and HFCs are extremely potent and stable greenhouse gases.

Stimulant

Ammonia, as the vapor released by smelling salts, has found significant use as a respiratory stimulant. Ammonia is commonly used in the illegal manufacture of methamphetamine through a Birch reduction. The Birch method of making methamphetamine is dangerous because the alkali metal and liquid ammonia are both extremely reactive, and the temperature of liquid ammonia makes it susceptible to explosive boiling when reactants are added.

Textile
Liquid ammonia is used for treatment of cotton materials, giving properties like mercerisation, using alkalis. In particular, it is used for prewashing of wool.

Lifting gas
At standard temperature and pressure, ammonia is less dense than atmosphere and has approximately 45–48% of the lifting power of hydrogen or helium. Ammonia has sometimes been used to fill balloons as a lifting gas. Because of its relatively high boiling point (compared to helium and hydrogen), ammonia could potentially be refrigerated and liquefied aboard an airship to reduce lift and add ballast (and returned to a gas to add lift and reduce ballast).

Fuming

Ammonia has been used to darken quartersawn white oak in Arts & Crafts and Mission-style furniture. Ammonia fumes react with the natural tannins in the wood and cause it to change colour.

Safety 

The US Occupational Safety and Health Administration (OSHA) has set a 15-minute exposure limit for gaseous ammonia of 35 ppm by volume in the environmental air and an 8-hour exposure limit of 25 ppm by volume. The National Institute for Occupational Safety and Health (NIOSH) recently reduced the IDLH (Immediately Dangerous to Life and Health, the level to which a healthy worker can be exposed for 30 minutes without suffering irreversible health effects) from 500 to 300 based on recent more conservative interpretations of original research in 1943. Other organizations have varying exposure levels. US Navy Standards [U.S. Bureau of Ships 1962] maximum allowable concentrations (MACs): for continuous exposure (60 days) is 25 ppm; for exposure of 1 hour is 400 ppm. 

Ammonia vapor has a sharp, irritating, pungent odor that acts as a warning of potentially dangerous exposure. The average odor threshold is 5 ppm, well below any danger or damage. Exposure to very high concentrations of gaseous ammonia can result in lung damage and death.

Liquid ammonia is dangerous because it is hygroscopic and because it can cause caustic burns. See  for more information.

Toxicity
The toxicity of ammonia solutions does not usually cause problems for humans and other mammals, as a specific mechanism exists to prevent its build-up in the bloodstream. Ammonia is converted to carbamoyl phosphate by the enzyme carbamoyl phosphate synthetase, and then enters the urea cycle to be either incorporated into amino acids or excreted in the urine. Fish and amphibians lack this mechanism, as they can usually eliminate ammonia from their bodies by direct excretion. Ammonia even at dilute concentrations is highly toxic to aquatic animals, and for this reason it is classified as dangerous for the environment. Atmospheric ammonia plays a key role in the formation of fine particulate matter.

Ammonia is a constituent of tobacco smoke.

Coking wastewater 
Ammonia is present in coking wastewater streams, as a liquid by-product of the production of coke from coal. In some cases, the ammonia is discharged to the marine environment where it acts as a pollutant. The Whyalla steelworks in South Australia is one example of a coke-producing facility which discharges ammonia into marine waters.

Aquaculture 
Ammonia toxicity is believed to be a cause of otherwise unexplained losses in fish hatcheries. Excess ammonia may accumulate and cause alteration of metabolism or increases in the body pH of the exposed organism. Tolerance varies among fish species. At lower concentrations, around 0.05 mg/L, un-ionised ammonia is harmful to fish species and can result in poor growth and feed conversion rates, reduced fecundity and fertility and increase stress and susceptibility to bacterial infections and diseases. Exposed to excess ammonia, fish may suffer loss of equilibrium, hyper-excitability, increased respiratory activity and oxygen uptake and increased heart rate. At concentrations exceeding 2.0 mg/L, ammonia causes gill and tissue damage, extreme lethargy, convulsions, coma, and death. Experiments have shown that the lethal concentration for a variety of fish species ranges from 0.2 to 2.0 mg/L.

During winter, when reduced feeds are administered to aquaculture stock, ammonia levels can be higher. Lower ambient temperatures reduce the rate of algal photosynthesis so less ammonia is removed by any algae present. Within an aquaculture environment, especially at large scale, there is no fast-acting remedy to elevated ammonia levels. Prevention rather than correction is recommended to reduce harm to farmed fish and in open water systems, the surrounding environment.

Storage information
Similar to propane, anhydrous ammonia boils below room temperature when at atmospheric pressure. Ammonia is used in numerous different industrial application requiring carbon or stainless steel storage vessels. Ammonia with at least 0.2% by weight water content is not corrosive to carbon steel.  carbon steel construction storage tanks with 0.2% by weight or more of water could last more than 50 years in service. Experts warn that ammonium compounds not be allowed to come in contact with bases (unless in an intended and contained reaction), as dangerous quantities of ammonia gas could be released.

Laboratory

The hazards of ammonia solutions depend on the concentration: "dilute" ammonia solutions are usually 5–10% by weight (<5.62 mol/L); "concentrated" solutions are usually prepared at >25% by weight. A 25% (by weight) solution has a density of 0.907 g/cm3, and a solution that has a lower density will be more concentrated. The European Union classification of ammonia solutions is given in the table.

The ammonia vapour from concentrated ammonia solutions is severely irritating to the eyes and the respiratory tract, and experts warn that these solutions only be handled in a fume hood. Saturated ("0.880" – see #Properties) solutions can develop a significant pressure inside a closed bottle in warm weather, and experts also warn that the bottle be opened with care. This is not usually a problem for 25% ("0.900") solutions.

Experts warn that ammonia solutions not be mixed with halogens, as toxic and/or explosive products are formed. Experts also warn that prolonged contact of ammonia solutions with silver, mercury or iodide salts can also lead to explosive products: such mixtures are often formed in qualitative inorganic analysis, and that it needs to be lightly acidified but not concentrated (<6% w/v) before disposal once the test is completed.

Laboratory use of anhydrous ammonia (gas or liquid)

Anhydrous ammonia is classified as toxic (T) and dangerous for the environment (N). The gas is flammable (autoignition temperature: 651 °C) and can form explosive mixtures with air (16–25%). The permissible exposure limit (PEL) in the United States is 50 ppm (35 mg/m3), while the IDLH concentration is estimated at 300 ppm. Repeated exposure to ammonia lowers the sensitivity to the smell of the gas: normally the odour is detectable at concentrations of less than 50 ppm, but desensitised individuals may not detect it even at concentrations of 100 ppm. Anhydrous ammonia corrodes copper- and zinc-containing alloys which makes brass fittings not appropriate for handling the gas. Liquid ammonia can also attack rubber and certain plastics.

Ammonia reacts violently with the halogens. Nitrogen triiodide, a primary high explosive, is formed when ammonia comes in contact with iodine. Ammonia causes the explosive polymerisation of ethylene oxide. It also forms explosive fulminating compounds with compounds of gold, silver, mercury, germanium or tellurium, and with stibine. Violent reactions have also been reported with acetaldehyde, hypochlorite solutions, potassium ferricyanide and peroxides.

Production

Ammonia has one of the highest rates of production of any inorganic chemical. Production is sometimes expressed in terms of 'fixed nitrogen'.  Global production was estimated as being 160 million tonnes in 2020 (147 tons of fixed nitrogen). China accounted for 26.5% of that, followed by Russia at 11.0%, the United States at 9.5%, and India at 8.3%.

Before the start of World War I, most ammonia was obtained by the dry distillation of nitrogenous vegetable and animal waste products, including camel dung, where it was distilled by the reduction of nitrous acid and nitrites with hydrogen; in addition, it was produced by the distillation of coal, and also by the decomposition of ammonium salts by alkaline hydroxides such as quicklime:

For small scale laboratory synthesis, one can heat urea and calcium hydroxide:

Haber–Bosch 

Mass production uses the Haber–Bosch process, a gas phase reaction between hydrogen and nitrogen at a moderately-elevated temperature (450 °C) and high pressure:

, ΔH° = −91.8 kJ/mol

This reaction is exothermic and results in decreased entropy, meaning that the reaction is favoured at lower temperatures and higher pressures. It is difficult and expensive to achieve, as lower temperatures result in slower reaction kinetics (hence a slower reaction rate) and high pressure requires high-strength pressure vessels that are not weakened by hydrogen embrittlement. Diatomic nitrogen is bound together by a triple bond, which makes it rather inert. Yield and efficiency are low, meaning that the output must be continuously separated and extracted for the reaction to proceed at an acceptable pace. Combined with the energy needed to produce hydrogen and purified atmospheric nitrogen, ammonia production is energy-intensive, accounting for 1% to 2% of global energy consumption, 3% of global carbon emissions, and 3 to 5% of natural gas consumption.

The choice of catalyst is important for synthesizing ammonia. In 2012, Hideo Hosono's group found that Ru-loaded calcium-aluminum oxide C12A7: electride works well as a catalyst and pursued more efficient formation. This method is implemented in a small plant for ammonia synthesis in Japan. In 2019, Hosono's group found another catalyst, a novel perovskite oxynitride-hydride , that works at lower temperature and without costly ruthenium.

Electrochemical 
Ammonia can be synthesized electrochemically. The only required inputs are sources of nitrogen (potentially atmospheric) and hydrogen (water), allowing generation at the point of use. The availability of renewable energy creates the possibility of zero emission production.

Another electrochemical synthesis mode involves the reductive formation of lithium nitride, which can be protonated to ammonia, given a proton source. Ethanol has been used as such a source, although it may degrade. The first use of this chemistry was reported in 1930, where lithium solutions in ethanol were used to produce ammonia at pressures of up to 1000 bar. In 1994, Tsuneto et al. used lithium electrodeposition in tetrahydrofuran to synthesize ammonia at more moderate pressures with reasonable Faradaic efficiency. Other studies have since used the ethanol-tetrahydrofuran system for electrochemical ammonia synthesis. In 2019, Lazouski et al. proposed a mechanism to explain observed ammonia formation kinetics.

In 2020, Lazouski et al. developed a solvent-agnostic gas diffusion electrode to improve nitrogen transport to the reactive lithium. The study observed  production rates of up to 30 ± 5 nanomoles/s/cm2 and Faradaic efficiencies of up to 47.5 ± 4% at ambient temperature and 1 bar pressure.

In 2021, Suryanto et al. replaced ethanol with a tetraalkyl phosphonium salt. This cation can stably undergo deprotonation–reprotonation cycles, while it enhances the medium's ionic conductivity. The study observed  production rates of 53 ± 1 nanomoles/s/cm2 at 69 ± 1% faradaic efficiency experiments under 0.5-bar hydrogen and 19.5-bar nitrogen partial pressure at ambient temperature.

Role in biological systems and human disease

Ammonia is both a metabolic waste and a metabolic input throughout the biosphere. It is an important source of nitrogen for living systems. Although atmospheric nitrogen abounds (more than 75%), few living creatures are capable of using atmospheric nitrogen in its diatomic form,  gas. Therefore, nitrogen fixation is required for the synthesis of amino acids, which are the building blocks of protein. Some plants rely on ammonia and other nitrogenous wastes incorporated into the soil by decaying matter. Others, such as nitrogen-fixing legumes, benefit from symbiotic relationships with rhizobia bacteria that create ammonia from atmospheric nitrogen.

In humans, inhaling ammonia in high concentrations can be fatal. Exposure to ammonia can cause headaches, edema, impaired memory, seizures and coma as it is neurotoxic in nature.

Biosynthesis
In certain organisms, ammonia is produced from atmospheric nitrogen by enzymes called nitrogenases. The overall process is called nitrogen fixation. Intense effort has been directed toward understanding the mechanism of biological nitrogen fixation. The scientific interest in this problem is motivated by the unusual structure of the active site of the enzyme, which consists of an  ensemble.

Ammonia is also a metabolic product of amino acid deamination catalyzed by enzymes such as glutamate dehydrogenase 1. Ammonia excretion is common in aquatic animals. In humans, it is quickly converted to urea, which is much less toxic, particularly less basic. This urea is a major component of the dry weight of urine. Most reptiles, birds, insects, and snails excrete uric acid solely as nitrogenous waste.

Physiology
Ammonia plays a role in both normal and abnormal animal physiology. It is biosynthesised through normal amino acid metabolism and is toxic in high concentrations. The liver converts ammonia to urea through a series of reactions known as the urea cycle. Liver dysfunction, such as that seen in cirrhosis, may lead to elevated amounts of ammonia in the blood (hyperammonemia). Likewise, defects in the enzymes responsible for the urea cycle, such as ornithine transcarbamylase, lead to hyperammonemia. Hyperammonemia contributes to the confusion and coma of hepatic encephalopathy, as well as the neurologic disease common in people with urea cycle defects and organic acidurias.

Ammonia is important for normal animal acid/base balance. After formation of ammonium from glutamine, α-ketoglutarate may be degraded to produce two bicarbonate ions, which are then available as buffers for dietary acids. Ammonium is excreted in the urine, resulting in net acid loss. Ammonia may itself diffuse across the renal tubules, combine with a hydrogen ion, and thus allow for further acid excretion.

Excretion

Ammonium ions are a toxic waste product of metabolism in animals. In fish and aquatic invertebrates, it is excreted directly into the water. In mammals, sharks, and amphibians, it is converted in the urea cycle to urea, which is less toxic and can be stored more efficiently. In birds, reptiles, and terrestrial snails, metabolic ammonium is converted into uric acid, which is solid and can therefore be excreted with minimal water loss.

Beyond Earth

Ammonia has been detected in the atmospheres of the giant planets Jupiter, Saturn, Uranus and Neptune, along with other gases such as methane, hydrogen, and helium. The interior of Saturn may include frozen ammonia crystals. It is found on Deimos and Phobos – the two moons of Mars.

Interstellar space
Ammonia was first detected in interstellar space in 1968, based on microwave emissions from the direction of the galactic core. This was the first polyatomic molecule to be so detected.
The sensitivity of the molecule to a broad range of excitations and the ease with which it can be observed in a number of regions has made ammonia one of the most important molecules for studies of molecular clouds. The relative intensity of the ammonia lines can be used to measure the temperature of the emitting medium.

The detection of triply deuterated ammonia was considered a surprise as deuterium is relatively scarce. It is thought that the low-temperature conditions allow this molecule to survive and accumulate.

Since its interstellar discovery,  has proved to be an invaluable spectroscopic tool in the study of the interstellar medium. With a large number of transitions sensitive to a wide range of excitation conditions,  has been widely astronomically detected – its detection has been reported in hundreds of journal articles. Listed below is a sample of journal articles that highlights the range of detectors that have been used to identify ammonia.

The study of interstellar ammonia has been important to a number of areas of research in the last few decades. Some of these are delineated below and primarily involve using ammonia as an interstellar thermometer.

Interstellar formation mechanisms
The interstellar abundance for ammonia has been measured for a variety of environments. The []/[] ratio has been estimated to range from 10−7 in small dark clouds up to 10−5 in the dense core of the Orion molecular cloud complex. Although a total of 18 total production routes have been proposed, the principal formation mechanism for interstellar  is the reaction:

The rate constant, k, of this reaction depends on the temperature of the environment, with a value of 5.2×10−6 at 10 K. The rate constant was calculated from the formula .

All other proposed formation reactions have rate constants of between 2 and 13 orders of magnitude smaller, making their contribution to the abundance of ammonia relatively insignificant. As an example of the minor contribution other formation reactions play, the reaction:

has a rate constant of 2.2. Assuming  densities of 105 and []/[] ratio of 10−7, this reaction proceeds at a rate of 2.2, more than 3 orders of magnitude slower than the primary reaction above.

Some of the other possible formation reactions are:

Interstellar destruction mechanisms
Of these, 39 were tabulated in extensive tables of the chemistry among C, N, and O compounds. A review of interstellar ammonia cites the following reactions as the principal dissociation mechanisms:

with rate constants of 4.39×10−9 and 2.2×10−9, respectively. The above equations run at a rate of 8.8×10−9 and 4.4×10−13, respectively. These calculations assumed the given rate constants and abundances of []/[] = 10−5, []/[] = 2×10−5, []/[] = 2×10−9, and total densities of n = 105, typical of cold, dense, molecular clouds. Clearly, between these two primary reactions, equation is the dominant destruction reaction, with a rate ≈10,000 times faster than equation.

Single antenna detections
The background corresponds well with the locations previously detected CO. The 25 m Chilbolton telescope in England detected radio signatures of ammonia in H II regions, HNH2O masers, H-H objects, and other objects associated with star formation. A comparison of emission line widths indicates that turbulent or systematic velocities do not increase in the central cores of molecular clouds.

Microwave radiation from ammonia was observed in several galactic objects including W3(OH), Orion A, W43, W51, and five sources in the galactic centre. The high detection rate indicates that this is a common molecule in the interstellar medium and that high-density regions are common in the galaxy.

Interferometric studies
They may play an important role in creating the bipolar outflow in the region.

Extragalactic ammonia was imaged using the VLA in IC 342. The hot gas has temperatures above 70 K, which was inferred from ammonia line ratios and appears to be closely associated with the innermost portions of the nuclear bar seen in CO.  was also monitored by VLA toward a sample of four galactic ultracompact HII regions: G9.62+0.19, G10.47+0.03, G29.96-0.02, and G31.41+0.31. Based upon temperature and density diagnostics, it is concluded that in general such clumps are probably the sites of massive star formation in an early evolutionary phase prior to the development of an ultracompact HII region.

Infrared detections
Absorption at 2.97 micrometres due to solid ammonia was recorded from interstellar grains in the Becklin-Neugebauer Object and probably in NGC 2264-IR as well. This detection helped explain the physical shape of previously poorly understood and related ice absorption lines.

A spectrum of the disk of Jupiter was obtained from the Kuiper Airborne Observatory, covering the 100 to 300 cm−1 spectral range. Analysis of the spectrum provides information on global mean properties of ammonia gas and an ammonia ice haze.

A total of 149 dark cloud positions were surveyed for evidence of "dense cores" by using the (J,K) = (1,1) rotating inversion line of NH3. In general, the cores are not spherically shaped, with aspect ratios ranging from 1.1 to 4.4. It is also found that cores with stars have broader lines than cores without stars.

Ammonia has been detected in the Draco Nebula and in one or possibly two molecular clouds, which are associated with the high-latitude galactic infrared cirrus. The finding is significant because they may represent the birthplaces for the Population I metallicity B-type stars in the galactic halo that could have been borne in the galactic disk.

Observations of nearby dark clouds
By balancing and stimulated emission with spontaneous emission, it is possible to construct a relation between excitation temperature and density. Moreover, since the transitional levels of ammonia can be approximated by a 2-level system at low temperatures, this calculation is fairly simple. This premise can be applied to dark clouds, regions suspected of having extremely low temperatures and possible sites for future star formation. Detections of ammonia in dark clouds show very narrow linesindicative not only of low temperatures, but also of a low level of inner-cloud turbulence. Line ratio calculations provide a measurement of cloud temperature that is independent of previous CO observations. The ammonia observations were consistent with CO measurements of rotation temperatures of ≈10 K. With this, densities can be determined, and have been calculated to range between 104 and 105 cm−3 in dark clouds. Mapping of  gives typical clouds sizes of 0.1 pc and masses near 1 solar mass. These cold, dense cores are the sites of future star formation.

UC HII regions
Ultra-compact HII regions are among the best tracers of high-mass star formation. The dense material surrounding UCHII regions is likely primarily molecular. Since a complete study of massive star formation necessarily involves the cloud from which the star formed, ammonia is an invaluable tool in understanding this surrounding molecular material. Since this molecular material can be spatially resolved, it is possible to constrain the heating/ionising sources, temperatures, masses, and sizes of the regions. Doppler-shifted velocity components allow for the separation of distinct regions of molecular gas that can trace outflows and hot cores originating from forming stars.

Extragalactic detection
Ammonia has been detected in external galaxies, and by simultaneously measuring several lines, it is possible to directly measure the gas temperature in these galaxies. Line ratios imply that gas temperatures are warm (≈50 K), originating from dense clouds with sizes of tens of pc. This picture is consistent with the picture within our Milky Way galaxyhot dense molecular cores form around newly forming stars embedded in larger clouds of molecular material on the scale of several hundred pc (giant molecular clouds; GMCs).

See also

Notes

References

Works Cited

Further reading

External links

International Chemical Safety Card 0414 (anhydrous ammonia), ilo.org.
International Chemical Safety Card 0215 (aqueous solutions), ilo.org.

Emergency Response to Ammonia Fertilizer Releases (Spills) for the Minnesota Department of Agriculture.ammoniaspills.org
National Institute for Occupational Safety and Health – Ammonia Page, cdc.gov
NIOSH Pocket Guide to Chemical Hazards – Ammonia, cdc.gov
Ammonia, video

 
 
Bases (chemistry)
Foul-smelling chemicals
Gaseous signaling molecules
Household chemicals
Industrial gases
Inorganic solvents
Nitrogen cycle
Nitrogen hydrides
Nitrogen(−III) compounds
Refrigerants
Toxicology